The 2015 All Ireland Ladies' Club Football Championship was the 39th edition of the All-Ireland Ladies' Club Football Championship.

Donaghmoyne (Monaghan) won the title after defeating Mourneabbey by 0-11 to 0-8 in the final.

Qualification

Results

All Ireland Ladies' Club Football Championship

References

2015
Club